Mentobe EP is an EP by American alternative metal band Taproot, released in 1998. Two of the tracks, "Comeback" and "Mirror's Reflection", are taken directly from the band's previous release ...Something More Than Nothing. The EP was later released in 1999 on the band's Upon Us EP. It received favorable reviews from the underground community.

Track listing

References

Taproot (band) albums
1998 EPs